Erin Dilly (born May 12, 1972) is an American actress. She is most noted for her portrayal of Truly Scrumptious in the 2005 musical Chitty Chitty Bang Bang, for which she was nominated for the Tony Award for Best Performance by a Leading Actress in a Musical and the Outer Critics Circle Award.

Career 
Dilly was raised in Southfield, Michigan and graduated from Birmingham Groves High School and the University of Michigan. In 2000 she was announced to play the lead in Thoroughly Modern Millie but left the show, being replaced by Sutton Foster. In addition to appearing on Broadway in Chitty Chitty Bang Bang in 2005, she played the role of Cinderella in the 2002 revival of Into the Woods.

Dilly has performed in regional theatre in Ken Ludwig's Leading Ladies at the Cleveland Play House and the Alley Theatre, Houston, Texas (2004).<ref>[http://www.kenludwig.com/leading_ladies/leading_ladies.php Leading Ladies production information] kenludwig.com, accessed September 30, 2009</ref> She also was "The Younger Woman" in Putting It Together at the Cape Playhouse, Massachusetts. She has performed in the national tour companies of South Pacific as Nellie (2001), Martin Guerre as Bertrande, and Beauty and the Beast as Belle (ca. 2000).

She appeared in the 2009 film Julie & Julia as Judith Jones.

She is married to actor Stephen Buntrock and they have two children together, Anna Louise Buntrock, born April 11, 2006, and Catherine Caroline Buntrock, born March 9, 2009. She also has a step-daughter, Haley Buntrock, from Stephen's previous marriage.Buntrock biography playbill.com, accessed September 30, 2009 She is the younger sister of celebrated surgeon Jason Dilly, M.D., F.A.C.S.

In 2014 she played the role of Eleanor Thompson a relative of Enoch "Nucky" Thompson who was played by actor Steve Buscemi & was based on Atlantic City, New Jersey political boss and racketeer Enoch L. Johnson in the HBO television series Boardwalk Empire.

In 2015, she played the role of The Baker’s Wife in The Muny’s production of Into the Woods.

In 2017 she played the role of Gwen Rice in "Genetics" the 11th episode of the 7th season of the CBS police procedural and legal drama Blue Bloods.

Broadway creditsChitty Chitty Bang Bang (2005 original production), as Truly ScrumptiousThe Boys from Syracuse (2002 revival) as LucianaInto the Woods (2002 revival)  as Cinderella, replacing Laura BenantiFollies (2001 revival) as Young PhyllisA Christmas Story (2012 original production) as Mother

Other stage workInto the Woods The Muny The Baker’s Wife (2015)Something Good (June 28, 2002 tribute concert to Richard Rodgers), performed "Oh Diogenes"Babes in Arms'' City Center Encores! (1999), staged concert as Billie Smith (also recorded)
City Center 60th Anniversary concert

References

External links

Official site

1972 births
American musical theatre actresses
American television actresses
Living people
People from Southfield, Michigan
Actresses from Michigan
Birmingham Groves High School alumni
University of Michigan alumni
21st-century American women